Minna Salmela (born May 3, 1971 in Oulu) is a retired female freestyle sprint swimmer from Finland. Salmela competed for her native country at two consecutive Summer Olympics, starting in 1992 in Barcelona, Spain. Her best result was a 14th place with the women's 4×100m medley relay team at the 1996 Summer Olympics, alongside Mia Hagman, Anu Koivisto, and Marja Pärssinen.

References
Profile

1971 births
Living people
Finnish female freestyle swimmers
Swimmers at the 1992 Summer Olympics
Swimmers at the 1996 Summer Olympics
Olympic swimmers of Finland
Sportspeople from Oulu